Ndereba is a surname. Notable people with the surname include:

 Anastasia Ndereba (born 1974), Kenyan marathon runner, sister of Catherine
 Catherine Ndereba (born 1972), Kenyan marathon runner

Surnames of Kenyan origin